Stephen Rae (born 30 April 1952) is a former Australian rules footballer who played with St Kilda and Richmond in the Victorian Football League during the 1970s.

Aged just 17 when he debuted for St Kilda in 1969, Rae was a half forward and played in the Saint's losing 1971 VFL Grand Final team.

In 1973 he asked to be cleared to Richmond where his friend, Ian Stewart played, the club refused and after more tension with the coach he crossed to Richmond during the 1973 season and played in their premiership side that year before persistent injuries to his knees and hands caused his retirement from VFL football in 1974.

Rae then turned to umpiring, first in the country before moving to umpiring the VFL Under 19s. He then returned to playing football and coaching for clubs throughout Victoria and was the Vice-President of the Hampden Football League in 1990.

He has a business in which he tunes pianos.

References

Holmesby, Russell and Main, Jim (2007). The Encyclopedia of AFL Footballers. 7th ed. Melbourne: Bas Publishing.

External links

1952 births
Living people
Richmond Football Club players
Richmond Football Club Premiership players
St Kilda Football Club players
Australian rules footballers from Victoria (Australia)
One-time VFL/AFL Premiership players